Pope Innocent II (died 24 September 1143), born Gregorio Papareschi, was head of the Catholic Church and ruler of the Papal States from 14 February 1130 to his death in 1143. His election as pope was controversial and the first eight years of his reign were marked by a struggle for recognition against the supporters of Anacletus II. He reached an understanding with King Lothair III of Germany who supported him against Anacletus and whom he crowned as Holy Roman emperor. Innocent went on to preside over the Second Lateran council.

Early years
Gregorio Papareschi came from a Roman family, probably of the rione Trastevere. Formerly a Cluniac monk, he was made cardinal deacon of San Angelo in 1116 by Pope Paschal II. Gregorio was selected by Pope Callixtus II for various important and difficult missions, such as the one to Worms for the conclusion of the Concordat of Worms, the peace accord made with Holy Roman Emperor Henry V in 1122, and also the one that made peace with King Louis VI of France in 1123. In 1124, he became a close advisor to Pope Honorius II.

Election as Pope

On the evening of 13 February 1130,  Pope Honorius II died, Gregorio was hastily elected as Pope Innocent II by a commission of six cardinals led by papal chancellor Haimeric. He was consecrated on 14 February, the day after Honorius' death. The other cardinals announced that Innocent had not been canonically elected and chose Anacletus II, a Roman whose family were the enemy of Haimeric's supporters, the Frangipani. Anacletus' mixed group of supporters were powerful enough to take control of Rome while Innocent was forced to flee north.

Papacy
Anacletus had control of Rome, so Innocent II took ship for Pisa, and thence sailed by way of Genoa to France, where the influence of Bernard of Clairvaux readily secured his cordial recognition by the clergy and the court. In October of 1130, he was duly acknowledged by King Lothair III of Germany and his bishops at the synod of Würzburg. In January 1131, he had also a favourable interview with Henry I of England at Chartres, and in August 1132 Lothar III undertook an expedition to Italy for the double purpose of setting aside Anacletus as antipope and of being crowned by Innocent. Anacletus and his supporters being in secure control of St. Peter's Basilica, the coronation ultimately took place in the Lateran Basilica (4 June 1133), but otherwise the expedition proved abortive. Innocent II invested Lothair as emperor and the territories belonging to Matilda of Tuscany in return for an annuity of 100 pounds of silver paid to the pope.

After Lothar's hasty departure from Rome, Innocent fled to Pisa. In May 1135, Innocent convened the council of Pisa, which was attended by over one hundred clerics and abbots. Innocent II had the council declare antipope Anacletus II and his supporters excommunicated.

The second expedition by Lothar III in 1136 was no more decisive in its results, and the protracted struggle between the rival pontiffs was terminated only by the death of Anacletus II on 25 January 1138.

In March 1139, in the Omne Datum Optimum, Innocent II declared that the Knights Templar—a religious and military organization then twenty-one years old—should in the future be answerable only to the papacy.

Second Lateran Council

At the Second Lateran council of April 1139, King Roger II of Sicily, Innocent II's most uncompromising foe, was excommunicated. Can. 29 of the Second Lateran Council under Pope Innocent II in 1139 banned the use of crossbows, as well as slings and bows, against Christians.

Treaty of Mignano
On 22 July 1139, at Galluccio, Roger II's son Roger III of Apulia ambushed the papal troops with a thousand knights and captured Innocent. On 25 July 1139, Innocent was forced to acknowledge the kingship and possessions of Roger with the Treaty of Mignano. Innocent II died on 24 September 1143 and was succeeded by Pope Celestine II.

Legacy
In 1134, Innocent elevated as cardinal-nephew his nephew, Gregorio Papareschi. He did the same for his brother Pietro Papareschi, whom he made cardinal in 1142. Another nephew, Cinthio Capellus (died 1182), was also a cardinal, raised to the cardinalate in 1158, after Innocent's death.

Aside from the complete rebuilding of the ancient church of Santa Maria in Trastevere, which boldly features Ionic capitals from former colonnades in the Baths of Caracalla and other richly detailed spolia from Roman monuments, the remaining years of Innocent's life were almost as barren of permanent political results as the first had been. In the Lateran palace, he had a portrait painted depicting Lothar's oath to preserve the privileges of the city of Rome. Innocent's efforts to undo the mischief wrought in Rome by the long schism were almost entirely neutralized by a quarrel with his erstwhile supporter, Louis VII of France over the candidate for archbishop of Bourges, in the course of which that kingdom was laid under an interdict to press for the papal candidate, and by a struggle with the town of Tivoli in which he became involved. As a result, Roman factions that wished Tivoli annihilated took up arms against Innocent.

In 1143, as the pope lay dying, the Commune of Rome, to resist papal power, began deliberations that officially reinstated the Roman Senate the following year. The pope was interred in a porphyry sarcophagus that contemporary tradition asserted had been the Emperor Hadrian's.

See also
Bull of Gniezno
List of popes
Cardinals created by Innocent II

References

Bibliography

Further reading

 
1143 deaths
Clergy from Rome
Italian popes
12th-century Italian cardinals
Burials at Santa Maria in Trastevere
Year of birth unknown
Popes
12th-century popes
House of Papareschi
Cardinals created by Pope Urban II